Pilar McShine (born 6 January 1987) is a Trinidad and Tobago international middle distance runner.

McShine holds the Trinidad and Tobago women's national records for 1500m, 1 mile and 3000m, outdoors and 1500 and 1 mile indoors.

References

Living people
Trinidad and Tobago female middle-distance runners
1987 births
Central American and Caribbean Games medalists in athletics